Francesco Mantica (1534–1614) was a Roman Catholic cardinal.

Biography
He was born in Udine, and studied canon law at the University of Padua. He became auditor of the Rota and Capella di Mano of pope Clement VIII, who named Mantica as cardinal in 1596. He died in Rome and is buried in Santa Maria del Popolo. He wrote De conjecturis ultimatum voluntatum (about last will and testaments), lib XI, published in 1754.

References

1534 births
1614 deaths
16th-century Italian cardinals
17th-century Italian cardinals
People from Udine
Cardinals created by Pope Pius VII